Netaji Bhavan is one of the stations of Kolkata Metro in Bhawanipore.

This name is from Netaji Bhawan, the nearby memorial hall and museum of Subhas Chandra Bose ("Netaji"). Scenes of the Netaji's life are painted inside the station.

History

In 1984, when the Metro opened in Kolkata (then Calcutta), it was the southern most station. The station at that time was "Bhawanipore". Later the name was changed to Netaji Bhawan.

Construction

This is an underground station with 2 tracks. The platform is of island type.

The station

Structure
Netaji Bhavan is underground metro station, situated on the Kolkata Metro Line 1 of Kolkata Metro.

Station layout

See also

Kolkata
List of Kolkata Metro stations
Transport in Kolkata
Kolkata Metro Rail Corporation
Kolkata Suburban Railway
Kolkata Monorail
Trams in Kolkata
Bhowanipore
E.M. Bypass
List of rapid transit systems
List of metro systems

References

External links
 
 Official Website for line 1
 UrbanRail.Net – descriptions of all metro systems in the world, each with a schematic map showing all stations.

Kolkata Metro stations
Railway stations in Kolkata